Ampthill tunnel is a railway tunnel at Ampthill on the Midland Main Line, being positioned between Bedford and Flitwick. It consists of two separate bores, each one accommodating double-track throughout.

The first Ampthill Tunnel was built during the 1860s; growing demand on the line led to the original double-track configuration being inadequate for further growth. Thus, during the 1890s, a second Ampthill Tunnel was constructed directly alongside, facilitating the Midland Railway's expansion plans of running a quadruple-track arrangement between Kettering and London wherever practical to do so. Both bores have remained active through to the present day.

History
The Ampthill Tunnel was constructed during the early 1860s on behalf of the Midland Railway to convey what would become the Midland Main Line. The local geology that the tunnel was bored through, which largely consisted of Oxford clay, was found to contain numerous fossils; a number of these were recovered during the excavations for the tunnel and subsequently studied.

By the 1890s, company officials had recognised that, due to a lack of free capacity for running further services, an expansion programme was required for the Midland Main Line, which primarily involved its widening from two tracks to four along much of the route between Kettering and London. In accordance with this policy, between June 1893 and 1895, a second Ampthill Tunnel was constructed alongside the first bore. As it was determined to be impracticable to drive a bore between the faces due to the lengthy cuttings on either side for the operating line, the additional tunnel was instead entirely excavated from three shafts that were sunk from above.

Having found the conditions imposed acceptable, numerous stretches of the line were cleared for trains to regularly run at the elevated maximum speed of 125 mph, including Ampthill Tunnel.

References

External links

 Ampthill Tunnel on the Midland Mainline via geograph.org.uk
 60103 'Flying Scotsman' races out of Ampthill Tunnel on 'The Yorkshireman' - 30/06/18 via youtube.com

Railway tunnels in England
Ampthill
Midland Railway
Rail transport in Bedfordshire
Tunnels in Bedfordshire